Phthia (lived 3rd century BC) was a daughter of Alexander II (272–260 BC), king of Epirus, and his half-sister Olympias II. 

Phthia became the wife of Demetrius II (239–229 BC), king of Macedonia. The match was arranged by her mother Olympias, who was desirous of thus securing the powerful assistance of the Macedonian king to support herself on the throne of Epirus after the death of Alexander.

References
Smith, William (editor); Dictionary of Greek and Roman Biography and Mythology, "Phthia (2)", Boston, (1867)

Notes

Ancient Epirotes
Ancient Macedonian queens consort
3rd-century BC Greek people
3rd-century BC Greek women
Ancient Epirote princesses